Aphallia is a congenital malformation in which the phallus (penis or clitoris) is absent. It is also known as penile agenesis in the case of males. The word is derived from the Greek a- for "not", and phallos for "penis". It is classified as an intersex variation.

Causes
Aphallia has no known cause. It is not linked to deficient hormone amounts or action, but rather to a failure of the fetal genital tubercle to form between 3 and 6 weeks after conception. The urethra of an affected child opens on the perineum.

Diagnosis

Treatment
Congenital anomalies like cryptorchidism, renal agenesis/dysplasia, musculoskeletal and cardiopulmonary anomalies are also common (>50% cases), hence evaluation of the patient for internal anomalies is mandatory.
Although aphallia can occur in any body type, it is considered a substantially more troublesome problem with those who have testes present, and has in the past sometimes been considered justification for assigning and rearing a genetically male infant as a girl, after the outdated 1950s theory that gender as a social construct was purely nurture and so an individual child could be raised early on and into one gender or the other, regardless of their genetics or brain chemistry. Intersex people generally advocate harshly against coercive genital reassignment however, and encourage infants to be raised choosing their own gender identity. The nurture theory has been largely abandoned and cases of trying to rear children this way have not proven to be successful transitions.

Nowadays consensus recommends male gender assignment.

Recent advances in surgical phalloplasty techniques have provided additional options for those still interested in pursuing surgery.

Incidence
It is a rare condition, with only approximately 60 cases reported as of 1989, and 75 cases as of 2005. However, due to the stigma of intersex conditions and the issues of keeping accurate statistics and records among doctors, it is likely there are more cases than reported.

See also
 Perineal urethra, where the urethra fails to develop normally
 Anorchia, where the testicles fail to develop

References

External links 

Congenital disorders of genital organs
Rare diseases
Intersex variations